Maithili may refer to:

 Maithils, an ethno-linguistic group native to India and Nepal
 Maithil Brahmin, a community within the Maithils
 Maithili language
 Maithili literature
 Maithili music
 Maithili Express, a mail/express type train of Indian Railways
 Maithili New Year, in the Maithili calendar
 Maithili Sharan (born 1953), Indian mathematician
 Maithili Sharan Gupt (1886-1964), Hindi poet

See also
 Maithili Karna Kayasthak Panjik Sarvekshan, a research study on the available ancient manuscripts in the Mithila region
 Mithila (region), Bihar, India, inhabited by the Maithils
 Mythili (born 1988), Indian actress
 Purvottar maithili
 Tirhuta Panchang, the calendar followed by the Maithils
 :mai:सम्मुख पन्ना, Maithili-language Wikipedia
 

Language and nationality disambiguation pages